Lepidophyllum is a genus of South American flowering plants in the family Asteraceae.

Species
There is only one accepted species, Lepidophyllum cupressiforme, native to southern Argentina (Santa Cruz and Tierra del Fuego Provinces) and southern Chile (Magallanes Region).

References

Monotypic Asteraceae genera
Astereae
Flora of South America